The Clinton River is a river in the Southland Region of the South Island of New Zealand. There is also a Clinton River in Canterbury, which is a tributary of the Puhi Puhi River.

The river lies completely within the Fiordland National Park and feeds into Lake Te Anau. The Milford Track follows the river from Lake Te Anau and then up the west branch of the river.

Lake Mintaro is a small lake on the west branch of the river.

References

Rivers of Fiordland